Nathan Barrett (born August 3, 1981) is a Canadian former professional ice hockey centre. Barrett was selected by the Vancouver Canucks in the 8th round (241st overall) of the 2000 NHL Entry Draft.

Between 2002 and 2006, Barrett played 257 games in the American Hockey League (AHL) with the St. John's Maple Leafs and Norfolk Admirals.

Career statistics

Awards and honors

External links

1981 births
Canadian ice hockey centres
Ice hockey people from Vancouver
Las Vegas Wranglers players
Lethbridge Hurricanes players
Living people
Norfolk Admirals players
St. John's Maple Leafs players
Straubing Tigers players
HC TPS players
Tri-City Americans players
Vancouver Canucks draft picks
Victoria Salmon Kings players
EHC Visp players
Wheeling Nailers players
Canadian expatriate ice hockey players in Finland
Canadian expatriate ice hockey players in Germany
Canadian expatriate ice hockey players in Switzerland